Adejumoke Aderounmu  is a Nigerian actress, born in Abeokuta, Ogun State Nigeria, where she had her elementary and secondary education. She is best known for playing roles like Esther And Kelechi in the popular Nollywood TV series Jenifa's Diary And Industreet, Jummy Adams in Nollywood's Box Office hit Movie Alakada 2 alongside Funke Akindele, Toyin Abraham, Odunlade Adekola, Linda Ejiofor, Falz, Juliana Olayode, Omotunde Adebowale David (Lolo) and more.

She was first Noticed as "Yejide" in Tunde Kelani's 2014 Movie Dazzling Mirage acting alongside Kunle Afolayan, Kemi Lala Akindoju, Taiwo Ajai-Lycett, Seun Akindele and more, played leading lady as Jummy Adams in 2013 Cinema Box Office Hit Movie by Toyin Abraham Alakada 2 alongside comedian Helen Paul, Odunlade Adekola, Bukky Wright, and more.

Early life and education 
Adejumoke was born into a family of five on 26 March, in the 80s at The Sacred hearts Hospitals in Abeokuta, Ogun State, Nigeria.

She attended St Banerdettes private schools Ibara Abeokuta, Abeokuta Girls’ Grammar School Onikolobo Abeokuta before proceeding to obtain a Bachelor of Arts Degree in international relations from Obafemi Awolowo University, Ile Ife, Osun State. She served one year of national service at Gombe state. She was also certified in Film Making and Acting from the La Cinefabrique multimedia Cine in Lyon, France in 2017 after she won a Ford Foundation scholarship at the Africa International Film Festival at her completion of a DSLR Film Making Training For Young Nigerian Film Makers in 2016. She began acting Professionally after auditioning for Tunde Kelani for the movie Arugba in 2008 where she played the role Princess Mobandele alongside Bukky Wright, Bukola Awoyemi, Segun Adefila, and more.

Career 
Adejumoke gained recognition in 2016 for her leading role as Esther (small but mighty) in a comedy TV series titled Jenifa's Diary. Adejumoke Aderounmu has over 10 movies (English/ Yoruba) to her credit as an actress. She worked as an on-air personality at Goldmyne Entertainment Presenter for Box Office TV show under Daniel Ademinokan In 2010/2011, Worked at Concert Radio (an online Radio station in Nigeria) from 2012 until 2015, then she proceeded to produce the first season of her TV show titled The Lounge with Jumoke, an entertainment show featuring celebrity interviews and fashion opinions, in 2012.

Brands and endorsements
Hadassah Bridals (2018)

Selected filmography
’’la femme Anjola’’ (2021)
’’Gone’’ (2021)
Industreet (2017)
The Ex (2015)
Jenifa's Diary (2016)
Alakada 2 (2013)
Wings of My Dreams (2013)
Dazzling Mirage (2014)
The Unwritten 1&2 (2009)
Patriots TV series (2008)
Arugba  (2008)

Awards and nominations
 Nominated for Best Actress at The African international film Festival, Dallas Texas (2016) 
 Nominated as Revelatio n of the year, BON awards, Nigeria (2015)
 Winner MayaAfrica Awards 4.0 Face Of Nollywood (2016) 
 Winner Scream Awards New Face Of Nollywood (2017)

Personal life 
Aderounmu is not married and has never been engaged or married.

See also
List of Yoruba people

References

Living people
Obafemi Awolowo University alumni
21st-century Nigerian actresses
Nigerian film actresses
Nigerian television actresses
Year of birth missing (living people)
Yoruba actresses
Actresses in Yoruba cinema
People from Abeokuta
Nigerian television producers
Nigerian media personalities